Szakadát is a village in Tolna County, Hungary.

Populated places in Tolna County